Vandenberg is a Dutch–American hard rock band from Amsterdam and Los Angeles, formed in 1981. The group is named after guitarist Adriaan "Adje" van den Berg (a.k.a. Adrian Vandenberg).

Career
In 1981, Van den Berg worked with vocalist Jos Veldhuizen, bass guitarist Griff "Studly" McGrath, and drummer Bico De Gooijer in a band called Teaser. This lineup did not last long, and Van den Berg hired Bert Heerink (vocals), Dick Kemper (bass guitar), and Jos Zoomer (drums). They renamed themselves Vandenberg and recorded a demo that came to the notice of journalist Kees Baars. He offered to manage the group and contracted them to Atlantic Records.

Their first album, Vandenberg, was recorded at former Led Zeppelin guitarist Jimmy Page's studio, Sol Studios, and in 1983, their first single, "Burning Heart", reached No. 39 on the U.S. Billboard Hot 100 record chart. Vandenberg toured the U.S. as the opening act for Ozzy Osbourne and KISS, and then independently in Japan in 1984. "Different Worlds", from their second album, Heading for a Storm, also did fairly well, but did not equal the success of "Burning Heart".

The band's third album, Alibi, was recorded in the Netherlands and produced by Jaap Eggermont, former drummer of Golden Earring. The album failed to enter the charts and not long after, the lead singer, Heerink, left the band. Demos with a new vocalist, Peter Struyk (a.k.a. Peter Stuyk, Peter Strikes, Peter Strykes, and Peter William Strykes), were not well received by Atlantic.

Around that time, Van den Berg (who often uses an Anglicized version of his Dutch name: Adrian Vandenberg) played as a guest soloist on a Whitesnake album and in 1987, Whitesnake vocalist David Coverdale asked him to join the band permanently. As he wasn't having much success with his own band, Vandenberg accepted the invitation.

In 2004, Vandenberg reunited and released a double CD, The Definitive Vandenberg, a compilation of their best songs, with a newly recorded version of "Burning Heart". In January 2005, the band released a DVD with footage of a 1984 Tokyo concert.

In July 2012, it was reported that Heerink, Kemper, and Zoomer were trying to take over the rights to the name "Van Den Berg" from the band's guitarist.

In January 2020, guitarist Adrian Vandenberg announced that the Vandenberg name would once again be used for an all-new lineup and new album, featuring former Rainbow vocalist Ronnie Romero on vocals, Rudy Sarzo on bass, and Brian Tichy on drums.

On 26 March 2020, the band announced the upcoming release of their first studio album in 35 years, simply titled 2020. The record came out on 29 May.

On 8 October 2021, Vandenberg announced that Swedish singer Mats Levén had joined the band.

Discography

Studio albums

Compilations
 The Best of Vandenberg (1988)
 Different Worlds: The Definitive Vandenberg (2004)

Video albums
 Live in Japan (2005)

References

External links
 

Atco Records artists
Dutch glam metal musical groups
Dutch hard rock musical groups
Musical groups from Amsterdam
Musical groups from Los Angeles
Musical groups established in 1981
Musical groups disestablished in 1987
Musical groups reestablished in 2020